Averof Neofytou (born 31 July 1961) is a Cypriot  politician, who is the President of the ruling Democratic Rally (DISY) party since 2013, and serves as Member of the House of Representatives since 2006, having previously served in the position from 1996 to 1999. Prior to his election to parliament, which he briefly left to serve as Minister of Communications and Works, he was active in local politics and served as Mayor of his hometown, Polis, from 1991 to 1998.

On 20 March 2022, he was confirmed as DISY's candidate for the 2023 Cypriot presidential election. In the first round, on 05 February 2023, he secured 26.11% of the votes, finishing third, below Nikos Christodoulides (32.04%) and Andreas Mavroyiannis (29.59%).

Early life and education

Averof Neofytou was born in Argaka, Paphos, in a non-political family. He completed his secondary education in the public school of Polis Chrysochous in Paphos. He studied Economics and Accountancy at the New York Institute of Technology. Averof Neofytou worked in the private sector before he became the mayor of his hometown in Paphos at the age of 30.

Political career

Neofytou served as Vice-president of the Youth of Democratic Rally (NEDISY). In 1991, at the age of 30, he was elected Mayor of Polis Chrysochou in the district of Paphos. In 1996, shortly before the end of his term as mayor, he was elected to the House of Representatives for the district of Paphos. 

In 1999, Neofytou was appointed Minister of Transport and Works in the government of Glafcos Clerides, a position he held until 2003. In 2003, he was elected as the Deputy President of Democratic Rally. In the parliamentary elections of 2006, 2011 and 2016, Neofytou was re-elected as a member of the House of Representatives for the Nicosia District. 

As a Member of Parliament, Neofytou has served as Chairman of the Parliamentary Committee on Finance and Budget, Chairman of the Parliamentary Committee on Foreign and European Affairs, leader of the delegation of the House to the Conference of the Presidents of the Foreign Affairs Committees of the European Union, leader of the delegation of the House to the Conference of European Affairs Committee of the Parliaments of the European Union, leader of the delegation of the House to the Inter-Parliamentary Union and as member of the Select Committee. 

Neofytou is currently the leader of the delegation of the House to the Inter-Parliamentary Union and to the Parliamentary Assembly of the Union for the Mediterranean. He is also the leader of the delegation of the House to the Inter-Parliamentary Conference on Stability, Economic Coordination and Governance in the European Union. In May 2013, Averof Neofytou was elected President of DISY, succeeding President Nicos Anastasiades.

Neofytou has served as a member of the Union of Municipalities of Cyprus, Honorary Secretary of the Paphos Chamber of Commerce and Industry, a member of the Board of the Cyprus Football Association and President of the Cyprus Anti-Cancer Society in Polis Chrysochous.

President of Democratic Rally (DISY)

Averof Neofytou took over the leadership of the Democratic Rally in 2013, at a time when Cyprus was severely hit by the financial crisis and had entered a financial agreement with Troika. The new DISY government was called to fix the ruined economy and overcome the deep recession. To achieve this, along with the successful efforts undertaken by the government, many necessary reforms had to be implemented with the approval of the Parliament. Under the leadership of Averof Neofytou, DISY managed to achieve the parliamentary support necessary to pass the reforms required by the economic adjustment program for Cyprus, even though the party lacked a Parliamentary majority in the House. Within three years after signing the memorandum of understanding, Cyprus exited the financial assistance program and returned to stable growth, demonstrating economic growth rates above the European Union average.

2023 Presidential Elections 
On December 22, 2021, Averof Neophytou announced that he would be a candidate in the presidential elections, in February 2023, as the official representative of DISY. He was supported by the president of Cyprus Nicos Anastasiades and the President of the House of Representatives Annita Demetriou.

After securing 26.11% of the public votes in the first round, he came third and failed to qualify for the second round. The independent candidate Nikos Christodoulides, supported by DIKO, EDEK, DIPA and Solidarity Movement, received 32.04% of the votes, finishing first. Andreas Mavroyiannis, an independent candidate supported by the left wing party AKEL, secured the second place, after receiving 29.59%.

Personal life

Averof Neofytou is married to Maria Selipa and has one son Pericles, named after his father. He is an ethnic Greek.

Articles and speeches

 Address by the President of the Democratic Rally, Mr. Averof Neofytou to the EPP Group, Brussels, 9 October 2019
 Address by the President of the Democratic Rally, Mr. Averof Neofytou at the Conference in honor of Federal Defence Minister of Germany, Dr. Ursula Von der Leyen "European & Eastern Mediterranean Security. Geopolitical challenges and opportunities", Thursday, 5 March 2019
 Address by the President of the Democratic Rally, Mr. Averof Neofytou at the Conference in honor of Commissioner of Digital Economy and Society, Ms. Mariya Gabriel, Thursday, 31 January 2019 
 Address by the President of the Democratic Rally, Mr. Averof Neofytou at the dinner in honor of Commission VP for Jobs, Growth, Investment and Competitiveness, Mr. Jyrki Katainen, Sunday, 27 January 2019 
 Keynote Address by the President of the Democratic Rally, Mr. Averof Neofytou, at the Dinner in honor of Manfred Weber, Thursday, 10 January 2019 
 Averof Neophytou, leader of Cyprus ruling party, presents a Digital vision for Cyprus 2030 
 EU Membership comes with responsibilities, 29/09/2015
 Security concerns in the Middle East and North Africa Regions, Address LII COSAC, Riga, 31 May – 2 June 2015
 «Israel: the credible and once forgotten neighbor», 06/01/2016

References

External links
 www.averof.org.cy Official web site of the President of the Democratic Rally 
 //www.disy.org.cy/ Official website of the Democratic Rally
 European People’s Party 
 @AverofCY Twitter
 Instagram

1961 births
Living people
New York Institute of Technology alumni
Democratic Rally politicians
Leaders of political parties in Cyprus
Members of the House of Representatives (Cyprus)
People from Paphos
Cyprus Ministers of Communications and Works
20th-century Cypriot politicians
21st-century Cypriot politicians
Candidates for President of Cyprus